Omar Avila is a Cuban-American actor who appeared in the films Once Upon A Wedding and The Punisher.  He grew up in Miami and got his big break in the Telemundo series Los Teens. He has appeared in several telenovelas, including Soñar No Cuesta Nada and Watch Over Me.  He also played Esteban Hernández in the third-season finale of House and Carlos in Cleaners. In an interview he spoke about his interest to make a movie in his birth country.

References

External links

 Omar Avila on Facebook

American male soap opera actors
American male telenovela actors
Year of birth missing (living people)
Living people
Hispanic and Latino American male actors
American male television actors
American male film actors